Rock & Roll Jihad is the first soundtrack album and the eighteenth overall album of the Pakistani band, Junoon. The soundtrack is based on Salman Ahmad and Junoon's musical journey. The album features five new studio recordings along with five live tracks from "The concert for Pakistan" and the album was officially released on 1 June 2010 under the record label Nameless Sufi Music on all major online stores. Salman Ahmad, lead guitarist & vocalist, also published a book named, Rock & Roll Jihad: A Muslim Rock Star's Revolution, regarding his time with Junoon and all the struggle he faced to become a rockstar. 

On 30 November 2009, Junoon announced that the first single off the album would be the song "Love Can You Take Me Back". On 14 March 2010, Junoon released the video of their first single.

Track listing
All music written & composed by Salman Ahmad and Andrew McCord, those which are not are mentioned below.

Personnel
All information is taken from the CD.

Junoon
Salman Ahmad - vocals, lead guitar

Additional musicians
Drums played by Sunny Jain
Bass guitar played by Chris Tarry & John Alec
Tablas by Samir Chatterjee
Dholaks by Didyarka Chatterjee
Violin by Yale Strom
Vocals on "Dum Mustt Qalandar" by Waqas Ali Qadri & Sussan Deyhim

Production
Produced by Salman Ahmad
Recorded & Mixed at by John Alec & David Cole
Recorded & Mixed at Grandview Studios, Grandview, New York
Recording engineering by Josh Kessler
Photography by Chris Ramirez

References

External links
 Junoon's Official Website

Junoon (band) albums
Junoon (band) live albums
2010 soundtrack albums
Soundtracks by Pakistani artists
Urdu-language albums
Insurgency in Khyber Pakhtunkhwa fiction